Los Caños may refer to:
Los Caños de Meca, a village in the province of Cádiz, Spain
Los Caños (band), musical group
Mariana Grajales Airport, an airport in  Guantánamo, Cuba originally known as Los Caños